Fazang (643–712) was the third of the five patriarchs of the Huayan school of Mahayana Buddhism, of which he is traditionally considered the founder. He was an important and influential philosopher, so much so that it has been claimed that he “was in fact the real creator of what is now known as Hua-yen”. Fazang’s ancestors came from Sogdia, a major center for trade along the Silk Road (modern Uzbekistan and Tajikistan), but he was born in the Tang capital of Chang'an (now Xi'an), where his family had become culturally Chinese.

Names
Although there remains ambiguity with varying interpretations of biographical sources, most recent scholarship promotes that the well-known name Fazang is not only the monk's dharma-name, but the secular name he used prior to being ordained. His surname was Kang, which originated from his place of birth, Kangjuguo. Furthermore, he had the nickname of Xianshou 賢首 which appears to have been the style-name given to him by his parents, despite prior claims that it was an honorific title from Empress Wu. This is further supported by Fazang’s self-reference using the nickname, which strongly suggests it was not an honorific title as previous scholars thought. His title as a teacher and of distinction (biéhào 別號) was Dharma Master Guoyi 國一法師, in which his disciples referred to him post-ordination and in the latter stages of his life.

Life and Times

643–700 AD
Fazang's family, originally prime ministers in Samarqand, migrated to China by his grandfather and resettled in Chang’an. His father, Kang Mi, held an official title in the Tang court, and not much was known about his mother, although supposedly she “... became pregnant after dreaming of swallowing rays of sunshine”. Accounts of the affluence of Fazang’s grandfather hint at his father’s ability to attain higher up positions in Tang aristocratic circles, despite being a Sogdian immigrant. However, epigraphic and textual sources show an abundance of ambiguity in terms of who his parents were, and especially his younger brother, Baozang, who is mentioned only in one textual source.

In contrast to the uncertainty and narrow roots of his immediate and blood relatives, Fazang’s dharma family is better recorded and far more extensive. Zhiyan, the second patriarch of the Avatamsaka tradition, was his primary teacher and philosophical influence, while his fellow scholars Daocheng and Baochen, additionally exerted influence. Fazang also had a multitude of fellow-disciples although sources only record four primary names: Huixiao, Huaiji, Huizhao, and most famously, Uisang, who went on to establish Hwaeom, Korean Huayan Buddhism. It is argued that he had many other disciples, a nun-disciple Facheng, two Korean disciples in addition to Uisang, and finally a Chinese biographer, Qianli.

In regard to Fazang’s life from his birth in 643 to his renouncement of homelessness in 670, biographical sources do not tell much. However, there are three primary facts that we do have evidence of during this time, namely Fazang's hermitage on Mount Zhongnan (Tàibái 太白山), his discipleship under Zhiyan 智嚴, and his entering the monastery in 670. Not much is recorded about his childhood in a Sogdian enclave, until he turned fifteen and set his finger on fire in front of a “Ayuwang shelita” – namely, a Famensi pagoda enshrining the finger bone of the Buddha. Fazang had interest in the Buddhist tradition from a young age and became disappointed in his initial search for a proper teacher. Consequently, he found solitude on nearby Mount Zhongnan, where he engaged in Daoist practices of consuming herbal elixirs and self-immolation, as well as beginning to study the Avatamsaka sutra from other fellow hermits who mastered the text. Evidence supposes that such practices contributed to Fazang’s later metaphysical doctrines, which have a Daoist flavor.

After several years of seclusion and hearing his parents were ill, Fazang returned to Chang’an and eventually met his first teacher Zhiyan, supposedly in dramatic fashion. He began his discipleship in roughly 663, however Fazang did extensive traveling and did not remain with his teacher consistently. Before Zhiyan's passing in 668, he instructed his two bhadanta-monks, Daocheng and Baochen to care for Fazang in his wake. This keen decision bode well, insofar as Daocheng was appointed as one of the three principles of the newly constructed monastery, Taiyuansi, which would be where Fazang would enter Buddhist priesthood for the remainder of his life. Previous biographical sources claim that Fazang was either overqualified for the bodhisattva-precepts or had his ordination situated in a miraculous context, yet both were distorted accounts attempting to validate the lack of evidence Fazang ever had a full ordination.

After 670 and Fazang's ordination to the Buddhist path, he spent time traveling between Mount Zhongnan and Taiyuansi. In 680, Fazang provides evidence that he was working with the Indian monk Divākara  on translating Indian texts into Chinese. Between 688–689, Fazang was ordered by Empress Wu to build a high Avatamsaka-seat and bodhimanda of Eight Assemblies in Luoyang. Such was a convention for elucidating and promoting the Avatamsaka sutra, further establishing rapport between Fazang and Empress Wu, who would soon after establish her dynasty in 690. It is also worth mentioning that during this period, Fazang kept important correspondence with his disciple Uisang, not only displaying his immense affection for his disciple, but providing a rare glimpse into the friendship between a Buddhist monk and master.

In the founding of Empress Wu’s dynasty in 690, Fazang continued his teaching of the Avatamsaka sutra, visiting his family, and debating with Daoist practitioners. A notable occurrence during this time was that Fazang was exiled to the south, but later returned to complete a new translation of the sutra after struggles with interpreting the text. Furthermore, Fazang participated in suppressing the rebellion of the Khitans against Empress Wu, invoking Buddhist rituals and ‘black magic’ which led to the Zhou army's victory and ultimately, strengthened the relationship between Empress Wu and Fazang.

The victorious war effort only increased enthusiasm for Buddhism, and accordingly, allowed the new translation of the Avatamsaka sutra to be rendered and released smoothly. In 700, Fazang continued lecturing on the new translation of the sutra, in one instance his commentary caused an earthquake and was celebrated as a great sign. Furthermore, Empress Wu’s ‘dream of ambrosia’ also occurred during this time, in which was a supposed auspicious sign accompanying the new translation of the sutra.

700–713 AD
The divide between the 7th and 8th centuries constitutes not only a change in century, but a sublimation from political and religious exuberance to unrest, especially with three successive reigns and political turmoil from the Zhang brothers. From 700–705, Fazang continued translation work on the order of Empress Wu, specifically a retranslation of the Lankavatara sutra, which was completed in 704. During this time, Fazang is said to have gone on a quest to Famensi to retrieve a sacred relic that supposedly provided therapeutic relief, which proved ineffective in addressing Empress Wu’s deteriorating health. After her retirement of the position due to political infighting, Li Xian was reinstated as emperor and Fazang declared his loyalty to him. Fazang is specifically credited with quelling the political rebellion of the Zhang brothers, and was accordingly recognized and rewarded with a fifth-rank title from Emperor Zhongzong.

From 708–709, a drought threatened the capital area, and Fazang was commanded to perform the  proper religious rituals to manifest rain. Much to Zhongzong’s contentment, on the 7th day, a heavy downpour came about and lasted for ten nights. Fazang’s miraculous abilities continued to be efficacious through shifts in power, combating continual droughts when Emperor Ruizong was awarded the throne in 710. In response to a lack of snow and water, he performed a dharani ritual for snow which had positive results.

In the last years of his life, Fazang had an increased support from the government in promoting Huayan Buddhism, and established monasteries in Wu and Yue. Fazang died on December 16, 712 at Great Jianfusi and was honored accordingly by Emperor Ruizong: The late monk Fazang inherited his virtuous karma from the Heavens, and his open (literally “empty” [xu 虛]) intelligence marked a match with the [true] principle. With his eloquence and excellent understanding, his mind was infused with penetrating enlightenment. He opened wide a gate for [others to hear] the parables about [crossing saṃsāra] on a raft; he propagated in full detail the teachings for handing the lamp over [to the generations]. Demonstrating [proper] responses in accordance with conditions, he thereby accorded with transformations and exhausted his life.

Philosophy
The Avatamsaka tradition depicts the cosmos as an infinite number of interdependent and interpenetrating parts, deploying the metaphor of Indra’s Net as a metaphysical and ontological theory. Furthermore, the Theravadan Buddhist theory of Pratītyasamutpāda is the derivative principle through which much of Huayan Buddhist operates, namely how all dharmas are conditioned and arise upon other dharmas. It would be safe to say that Fazang brought out the metaphysical implications of this Buddhist doctrine following the Mahayana tradition, in a uniquely Chinese prose with Daoist influence. Fazang is said to have authored over a hundred volumes of essays and commentaries, but two of his works in particular are among the most celebrated Huayan texts: The Rafter Dialogue and On the Golden Lion.

The Rafter Dialogue
One of more well-known texts written by Fazang is “The Rafter Dialogue”, in which conceptualizes his attempts to explain Huayan principles and mereology through the relation between a rafter (a part) and the building (a whole). It is a portion of a longer, systematic treatise, Paragraphs on the Doctrine of Difference and Identity of the One Vehicle of Huayan, which may be found in the Taishō Tripiṭaka, where it is text 1866. In the dialogue, the principles of interpenetration and emptiness of phenomena are articulated, insofar as no condition or dharma can arise without the arising of another condition or dharma. Any thing or condition therefore is necessarily dependent upon another condition and conversely, lacks both independence and a static or substantial identity. In this way, things share in being empty and lacking an essential character, but also are distinct insofar as they have a unique and particular function in web of dependent causes. As Fazang says, “each part is identical (in making the whole and in allowing each part to be what it is), and they are identical because they are different”. The dialogue itself is structured into six characteristics, or six various ways to understand the relation between part and whole and between part and part. David Elstein depicts these in a summarized fashion.

 Wholeness – the identity of part and whole
 Particularity – the distinction between the parts and whole
 Identity – the mutual identity between each part, by virtue of the fact that they together form a whole
 Difference – the distinct functions of each part that allow them to form a whole
 Integration – how the distinct parts unite as conditions for the whole
 Disintegration – the fact that each part maintains its particularity while constituting the whole

As Elstein emphasizes, this isn’t an attempt to explain how parts fit into a whole but rather the elucidation of six different mereological perspectives which are available for viewing at any time. In other words, Fazang is not providing a strict sequential analysis of our causal nexus, but rather displays available perspectives of things depending on what elements are in the spotlight. Furthermore, throughout the text, Fazang warns readers of the extremes of “annihilationism” and “eternalism” insofar as these are both ontological extremes that the Buddha originally rejected in embracing the “Middle Way”. To either posit objects as completely illusory and non-existence or conversely, to posit objects as independent and uncaused entities will both result in error. Only in embracing the mean between these extremes and understanding things as such will result in ‘right view’, one of the original tenets of the Eightfold Path.

Essay on the Golden Lion
In his most famous and widely-known work, Fazang is attempting to describe the high-flying and abstruse principles of Huayan Buddhism to China’s only female emperor, Empress Wu, who wanted a clearer demonstration of them. His essay “On the Golden Lion” may be found in the Taishō Tripiṭaka, where it is text 1881, and is accompanied by the Song dynasty commentary of Cheng Qian. Although skepticism remains as to if these conversations did really occur, such a teaching is intended to make Huayan more accessible and concrete to the novice through using the statue of a golden lion as a metaphorical device. As van Norden states, “The gold of the statue is a metaphor for the unified, underlying Pattern (li 理) while the appearance of the statue as a lion is for our illusory perception of things as independent individuals”.

Such a metaphor is intended to illuminate the relation between pattern and appearance, namely how the reality of the statue is not really a lion, but only gold carved to look like a lion. Analogously, this is supposed to entail the relation between objects and their underlying nature, i.e. an object appears independent as does the keyboard in front of oneself, and yet ‘keyboard’ was just a name attached to this object that actually is empty of any inherent essence or essential name. The names we attach to things are without a doubt pragmatic and Fazang makes clear we should not abandon our conventional way of understanding, as without it, the teachings could never be made accessible. However, our conventional labels are not wholly representative of the Pattern and ultimate nature of the object, therefore showing their limitations in seeking enlightenment and seeing ‘things-in-themselves’.

Influence
Fazang's greatest influence was upon his disciple Uisang, who was a senior disciple to Fazang and eventually returned to Korea to establish a brand of Korean Huayan Buddhism, namely Hwaeom. It is well documented that they had a lifelong friendship and frequently corresponded through written letters. Furthermore, he is sometimes credited for having contributed greatly in improving, if not inventing the technology of wood block carving, i.e. xylography.

In terms of propagating Huayan Buddhism in China, one of Fazang's greatest contributions was through his translation work, producing a new translation of the Avatamsaka sutra and collaborating with six Tripitaka masters in his efforts to translate it from Sanskrit to Chinese. Furthermore, the teachings of the Avatamsaka sutra were propagated through his close relationship with Empress Wu, and which was strengthened by Fazang’s quelling the Zhang brothers, and Khitan rebellion. This ultimately led to the further establishment of Huayan Buddhist monasteries in around Chang'an as well as in Wu and Yue.

References

Further reading

External links
 
 

Tang dynasty Buddhists
Chinese Buddhists
Chinese Buddhist monks
Huayan Buddhists
7th-century Buddhist monks
8th-century Buddhist monks
643 births
712 deaths
Sogdian people
Buddhist monks from the Western Regions